Carl Walter (c. 1831 – 7 October 1907), also known as Charles Walter, was a German-born botanist and photographer who worked in Australia. He was born in Mecklenburg, Germany in about 1831 and arrived in Victoria in the 1850s.

Botanical work

Walter discovered and collected a new species of mint bush on Mount Ellery which was named in his honour as Prostanthera walteri by Victorian Government Botanist Ferdinand von Mueller in 1870 . It is thought that Walter accompanied the geodetic survey team headed by Government Astronomer Robert L. J. Ellery which surveyed East Gippsland and the border with New South Wales from 1869 to 1871.

He collected plants on behalf of Anatole von Hügel  and was accompanied by missionary George Brown in exploring the Bismarck Archipelago in 1875.

In 1889, Walter collected the type specimen of Eucalyptus x brevirostris in the Upper Yarra region in 1889.

During the 1890s, Walter  collected plant specimens in the Australian Alps, accompanied by Charles French junior.

From the 1890s until his death in 1907, Walter was head of economic botany at the Technological Museum in Melbourne.

In 1906, Walter described a new subspecies of the orchid Diuris punctata in The Victorian Naturalist, based on plant material collected at Mount Arapiles by St. Eloy D'Alton. He named it Diuris puncata var. d'Altoni, subsequently revised to daltoni.

Photography
Walter set up a photographic studio in Melbourne, promoting himself as a "Country Photographic Artist" or "Landscape Photographic Artist" and many of his images were reproduced as woodcuts in contemporary journals. For a twenty-year period starting from about 1862, he would periodically travel to eastern and alpine regions of Victoria with camera equipment and camping gear in a backpack.

In 1866 Walter took 106 photographs of Aboriginal people at Coranderrk east of Melbourne, which were exhibited at the Intercolonial Exhibition of Australasia in  Melbourne in 1866-67.

References

1907 deaths
19th-century Australian botanists
Botanists active in Australia
Botanical collectors active in Australia
Botanists with author abbreviations
19th-century German botanists
People from the Grand Duchy of Mecklenburg-Schwerin
German emigrants to Australia
Australian photographers
1830s births